Queer Eye: Germany is a German reality television series, initially released on March 9, 2022 on Netflix.

Following the format of the popular American series Queer Eye, the series features five experts to complete the makeovers. It is the first international adaptation of Queer Eye. The series was positively reviewed in The Guardian.

Main cast 

The German fab five, are:

 Leni Bolt  –  "Lifestyle," a work life coach 
 Avi Jakobs  – "Beauty", an expert in hair and makeup
 Aljosha Muttardi  – "Health", a doctor and a nutrition consultant
 Jan-Henrik Scheper-Stuke  – "Fashion", fashion virtuoso
 Ayan Yuruk  – "Design", an owner of an interior design agency

References 

German reality television series
2022 German television series debuts
2020s LGBT-related reality television series
German LGBT-related television shows
Makeover reality television series
German-language Netflix original programming
German television series based on American television series